Shadow of the Sword: A Marine's Journey of War, Heroism, and Redemption is an autobiographical account of post-traumatic stress disorder by Jeremiah Workman, who served with the US Marine Corps in the Iraq War.

Workman received the Navy Cross for gallantry under fire after killing twenty insurgents in Fallujah, Iraq, on December 23, 2004, but later suffered flashbacks reliving the death of three fellow marines in the battle. He also describes having been ordered to "push at least two recruits into suicide attempts" while a drill instructor, an episode that a WSJ reviewer calls "the only part of the book that sounds implausible, given the standards that define the Marines".

References

External links
 Author Interview at the Pritzker Military Museum & Library on October 15, 2009

Iraq War books
2009 non-fiction books
American autobiographies
Ballantine Books books